Fading Shades is the sixth studio album by German singer Sandra, released on 12 June 1995 by Virgin Records.

Background
Sandra recorded Fading Shades while pregnant with twins and was having to sit during the recording sessions. The album saw a new collaborator Jens Gad working alongside Michael Cretu as a writer, arranger, programmer and producer. Again, Andy "Angel" Hart performed all the male vocals on the album.

The first single released from the album was a cover version of The Moody Blues song "Nights in White Satin", which reached number 34 in New Zealand and 86 in Germany, becoming one of Sandra's lowest-charting singles in her home country. It was more successful in Israel and Finland. The song's music video featured only close-ups of Sandra's face as she was heavily pregnant at the time. A still from the video served as the album cover. "Won't Run Away" was released as the second and final single, and was Sandra's first single since 1984's "Japan ist weit" not to receive a music video. The CD single included three remixes of the song. It was commercially unsuccessful and did not enter any charts, apart from reaching lower regions of the German airplay top 100.

The album is one of Sandra's least successful releases, reaching number 42 in Germany and number 37 in Switzerland.

Track listing
"Fading Shades" (Part I) (Jens Gad) – 1:02
"Nights in White Satin" (Justin Hayward) – 3:34
"Son of a Time Machine" (Jens Gad, Michael Cretu, Klaus Hirschburger) – 5:01
"Won't Run Away" (Jens Gad, Klaus Hirschburger) – 4:14
"Tell Me More" (Jens Gad, Klaus Hirschburger) – 3:15
"Will You Whisper" (Jens Gad, Klaus Hirschburger) – 4:13
"Invisible Shelter" (Jens Gad, Michael Cretu, Klaus Hirschburger) – 5:20
"You Are So Beautiful" (Jens Gad, Klaus Hirschburger) – 4:38
"I Need Love '95" (Michael Cretu, Klaus Hirschburger) – 3:28
"First Lullaby" (Michael Cretu, Jens Gad, KlausHirschburger) – 4:20
"Fading Shades" (Part II) (Jens Gad) – 1:06

Charts

References

1995 albums
Albums produced by Michael Cretu
Sandra (singer) albums
Virgin Records albums